Frederick Smith  was an English footballer.

He was born in Oldham, Lancashire, and played League football for Stockport County, Darlington, Exeter City and Gillingham.

References

Year of birth missing
Year of death missing
English footballers
Footballers from Oldham
Association football forwards
Chadderton F.C. players
Ashton United F.C. players
Stockport County F.C. players
Ashton National F.C. players
Darlington F.C. players
Exeter City F.C. players
Gillingham F.C. players
English Football League players